June Jaronitzky (born June 9, 1938) was a Republican politician and legislator from Wisconsin.

Born in Alberta, Canada, June graduated from Alberta College and MacTavish College. She served in the Wisconsin State Assembly for two terms. She was a member of the Bayfield County Republican Party, and the Iron River Speedway Association. June has worn many hats including teaching, cheese making, and cost accounting. She has six children and is now retired in the Houston, Texas area.

Notes

MacEwan University alumni
Women state legislators in Wisconsin
1938 births
Living people
21st-century American women
Republican Party members of the Wisconsin State Assembly